WOXM (90.1 FM) is a radio station licensed to Middlebury, Vermont. The station is owned by Vermont Public, and carries classical music through the VPR Classical network.

WOXM signed on May 27, 2010. In April 2014, the WOXM call sign moved to 89.1 FM; the 90.1 FM license then changed its call letters to WVXM and went silent. By October 2015, VPR had discovered that the new WOXM was interfering with the Vermont Electric Power Company's emergency response radio system; on October 12, 2015, VPR Classical was moved back to the 90.1 facility. The station changed its call sign back to WOXM on June 28, 2019.

References

External links

OXM
NPR member stations
Classical music radio stations in the United States
Radio stations established in 2010
2010 establishments in Vermont